Janice Beatrice Murray (born 1943) is an Australian public relations consultant, writer and media personality.

Career

Politics
Murray contested the seat of Eastwood at the 1978 New South Wales state election for the New South Wales branch of the Australian Labor Party.  Although gaining a swing of over 7% in her favour and contributing to a swing away from the Liberal Party of over 13%, Murray was unsuccessful, beaten by incumbent Member for Eastwood, and former TreasurerJim Clough, who secured 51.44% of the vote compared to Murray's 42.52%.

Public relations
From 1981, Murray was principal of Jan Murray & Associates Pty Ltd––a public relations firm that handled a variety of high-profile campaigns, including the spectacular Gala Opening of the Gold Coast International Hotel, and the Australian Tourism Commission's Shrimp on the barbie advertisements featuring Australian actor Paul Hogan, which was overseen by her then-husband, Minister for Tourism, John Brown.

In 1987/8 Murray's firm worked gratis to rescue what would become the highlight of the Australian Bicentenary celebrations, the First Fleet Re-enactment Voyage . The brave venture was in dire straights––the Commonwealth refusing to contribute. JMA raised millions of dollars by organizing an emergency radiothon on 2UE and sourcing corporate sponsorship for the venture. The consultancy finished the exhaustive but highly successful eight-month campaign having personally lost $60,000.

The consultancy was also involved in other aspects of public relations and was able to have the Bjelkie-Petersen government contribute $10million to save the still-incomplete Mike Gore Sanctuary Cove development. The appreciative Mr Gore had Murray accompany him in his helicopter the day it flew over the vast property at the moment the dam was opened to allow the water to flood in to the completed and spectacular resort.

During the historic bushfires which ringed Sydney in the summer holiday period of 1994, Murray and her son Christopher Brown––with the new Lord Mayor of Sydney Frank Sartor on holidays with his family on the south coast of NSW––took up residence in his (empty) Lord Mayoral chambers and after legally establishing the Lord Mayor's Bushfire Appeal and the Commonwealth Bank as the receiving bank, set about hitting up Australia's 'Top end of Town', raising $11.3million from the corporate sector (again gratis). In the following weeks, Murray was appointed to the Lord Mayor's Bushfire Appeal Trust which had the responsibility to disseminate the funds––mainly to purchase upgraded firefighting equipment––and made certain at least $250,000 went towards wildlife rescue. 

The following year, with the Festival of Sydney in trouble and the main corporate sponsor of the Christmas Carols in the Park pulling out––and hence Channel Nine considering not broadcasting––the consultancy helped put the show back on the road by raising funds and bringing the TV network back onboard.
Again, the consultancy gave its services gratis.

Television
On television, during the 70's and 80's Murray was a regular guest on The Mike Walsh Show and was the controversial left wing panellist on Ch10/Foxtel's daytime discussion program Beauty and the Beast from 1996 to 2005, where she became known for her frequent volatile arguments with the show's host, Stan Zemanek.

Writing
Murray, with her background in Tourism, developed the concept for what became Channel Nine's "Getaway" show in 1992. In 2010 she published her memoir Sheer Madness: Sex, Lies and Politics . In 2012, Murray published a novel called Goodbye Lullaby. Murray has recently published a revised edition of "Goodbye Lullaby" (2022) along with a new novel "Bright Echoes" and a middle school book, NO BRIDGE, NO WAY!: A Glencairn Island Mystery. Also in 2019, Murray published her second memoir, Pilgrim Souls: A Memoir. The books are marketed online at www.janmurray.com

Personal life
From age six, Murray suffered a sever hearing loss and subsequently learned to lip read. In 1963, Murray married John Brown, who became Member for Parramatta at the 1977 Australian federal election and became a Federal Government Minister in 1983 in the First Hawke Ministry before he entered Cabinet in 1987.

Murray graduated from Macquarie University in 1981 with a Bachelor of Arts (Honours), majoring in political science, English and media.

Sex on the desk scandal
Following initial reports in The Sun, Murray admitted during a 60 Minutes interview in 1987 to having sexual intercourse with her husband on his desk in his office at Parliament House in Canberra in 1983, and leaving her nickers in an ashtray. A spokesperson for Australian Prime Minister Bob Hawke said while Murray's comments were in "poor taste" they had nothing to do with Brown's ministerial duties.

When Ch Nine approached the controversial Jan Murray for their Sixty Minutes story, as an avowed feminist, she accepted on the condition she be given means to make the point that the role of the 'dutiful Minister's Wife' was not for her. No flowered hats and long white gloves. It was a new dawn. Many women, even while raising families, also had careers outside the home and the government should not expect political spouses to fall into line as in days gone by. She had previously locked horns with PM Hawke when he attempted to legislate for parliamentary wives to declare their pecuniary interests––at the same time he was spruiking his Equal Opportunity legislation and his determination to afford women independence. The ultimate 'Murray' amendment, written about in the Financial Times, is recorded in Hansard. 

The so-called 'Sex on the Desk' Sixty Minute scandal which went to air in March 1987 rocked the nation, being the most popular segment ever to be shown by Ch Nine (beating the popular 'Alf' segment!). After three days of filming Murray as she went about organizing the Gala Lunch for Bjelksie-Petersen during the Opening of the Gold Coast International Hotel, as well as being interviewed by Mike Monroe at her home and at the Lobby Restaurant in Canberra, the network heavily edited out all of Murray's feminist discussion, in which she had emphasised she had travelled to Canberra that night to seek her conjugal rights, not as the media would portray it, 'celebrating Brown's rise to the ministry'. Quite the opposite. But only one (female) journalist, Krisitn Williamson, got it right. The rest preferred to sensationalize the declaration of a wife having married sex with her husband and father of their five children. Her case was that the federal parliamentary system was contradictory to the conservative rhetoric eulogising family life. Rather, it took a parent/spouse away for days, often for weeks, from his (mainly)family.

Murray's on-screen 'desk' revelation continues to be referred to occasionally in the Australian media.

References

External links
 

1943 births
Living people
Macquarie University alumni